Manuel Soto may refer to:

Manuel Ángel Núñez Soto (born 1951), Mexican politician
Manuel Soto (athlete) (born 1994), Colombian athlete
Manoel Soto (1944–2019), Spanish politician, also spelled as Manuel Soto